The 2022 season was the Northern Superchargers second season of the 100 ball franchise cricket, The Hundred. Neither the men's or women's teams could improve from the 2021 season, with both teams finishing in the bottom half of their groups.

Players

Men's side 
 Bold denotes players with international caps.

Women's side 
 Bold denotes players with international caps.

Group fixtures

Fixtures (Men)

Fixtures (Women)
Due to the shortened women's competition, Northern Superchargers didn't play against Trent Rockets.

Standings

Women

 advances to Final
 advances to the Eliminator

Men

 advances to Final
 advances to the Eliminator

References

The Hundred (cricket)
2022 in English cricket